Furong Square station is a subway station in Changsha, Hunan, China, operated by the Changsha subway operator Changsha Metro. Its No.4 exit is just located a few meters away from the entrance of Carrefour.

Station layout
The station has one island platform.

History
The station opened on 29 April 2014.

Surrounding area
Xinhua Book Store (Chinese: 新华书店)
Carrefour (Chinese: 家乐福)

References

Railway stations in Hunan
Railway stations in China opened in 2014